FC Yessentuki is a Russian football team based in Yessentuki. It was founded in 2014 and played on the amateur level. For 2020–21 season, it received the license for the third-tier Russian Professional Football League.

Current squad
As of 22 February 2023, according to the Second League website.

References

Association football clubs established in 2016
Football clubs in Russia
Sport in Stavropol Krai
2016 establishments in Russia